María Marcela González Salas (born 18 November 1947) is a Mexican politician affiliated with the Institutional Revolutionary Party (previously to the Party of the Democratic Revolution). As of 2014 she served as Deputy of the LIII and LIX Legislatures of the Mexican Congress as a plurinominal representative.

References

1947 births
Living people
Politicians from Mexico City
Women members of the Chamber of Deputies (Mexico)
Members of the Chamber of Deputies (Mexico)
Presidents of the Chamber of Deputies (Mexico)
Institutional Revolutionary Party politicians
Party of the Democratic Revolution politicians
21st-century Mexican politicians
21st-century Mexican women politicians
Women legislative speakers
Instituto Tecnológico Autónomo de México alumni
20th-century Mexican politicians
20th-century Mexican women politicians
Deputies of the LIII Legislature of Mexico
Deputies of the LIX Legislature of Mexico